Tim Benjamin (born 1975) is an English composer.

Early life and education
Tim Benjamin was born in 1975, grew up in North London and attended Christ's Hospital school.

He studied composition at the Royal Northern College of Music under Anthony Gilbert, privately with Steve Martland and with Robert Saxton at the University of Oxford.

He lives in Todmorden, West Yorkshire.

Music
Benjamin composes chamber-sized one-act operas for performance in small theatres and non-standard spaces.

His first opera The Bridge (to a libretto by David Edgar) won the Stephen Oliver Trust's Prize for Contemporary Opera in 1994, resulting in its performance as part of the Covent Garden Festival in 1998.

His second opera, The Corley Conspiracy, was performed in September 2007 at the Southbank Centre, London.

His opera Emily (libretto by the composer) was first performed at the Todmorden Hippodrome in July 2013.

His opera Madame X (libretto by Anthony Peter) was performed at the Grimeborn 2014 festival.

His twin operas Rest In Peace (libretto translated and adapted by the composer, after Chekhov) and Silent Jack (libretto by the composer and Anthony Peter) were performed at the 2015 Tête-à-Tête Festival.

Awards and recognition
Benjamin won the BBC Young Composer of the Year award in 1993 with his piece Antagony.

In 1996 he won the Stephen Oliver Prize, for his first opera The Bridge (to a libretto by David Edgar). The prize, which was worth £10,000, was awarded to a young composer for a new work of comic opera. During 1997 and 1998 the Stephen Oliver Trust worked with the Royal Northern College of Music and the 1998 BOC Covent Garden Festival to achieve the  performance of his winning opera, and that of the 1994 winner, David Horne's Travellers. Both operas were  brought to the stage in June 1998, as part of the 1998 Covent Garden Festival.

Legacy
In 2015, Benjamin founded the Steve Martland Scholarship for young composers at the Sound and Music Summer School, in honour of his former mentor.

References

External links

1975 births
Living people
English classical composers
English opera composers
Male opera composers
20th-century classical composers
21st-century classical composers
Musicians from London
People educated at Christ's Hospital
English male classical composers
20th-century English composers
21st-century English composers
20th-century British male musicians
20th-century British musicians
21st-century British male musicians